Mayakovski (also Mayakawvsky) is a village in the Kotayk Province of Armenia.

Etymology 
The village was named in honor of the Soviet poet Vladimir Mayakovsky. The village was previously known as Shaab or Shahab.

References

External links 
 Kiesling, Rediscovering Armenia, p. 58, available online at the US embassy to Armenia's website
 

Populated places in Kotayk Province
Yazidi populated places in Armenia